Syed Abdul Hadi (born 1 July 1940) is a Bangladeshi singer. He won the Bangladesh National Film Award for Best Male Playback Singer five times for his playback performance in the films Golapi Ekhon Traine (1979), Sundori (1979), Koshai (1980), Goriber Bou (1990) and Khoma (1992). He is the recipient of Ekushey Padak in 2000.

Early life and background
Hadi was born at Shahpur village in Kasba, Brahmanbaria in the-then British India.  He grew up in Agartala, at his grandfather's house, who was a lawyer of the Agartala court. He graduated from Dhaka College and the University of Dhaka.

Career
Hadi debuted as a singer for the film Ye Bhi Ek Kahani (1964).

Discography
Solo albums
 Ekbar Jodi Keu
 Prithibir Panthoshala
 EkDin Chole Jabo
 Kotha Bolbo Na
 Megher Palki / Best of Syed Abdul Hadi
 Jokhon Vanglo Milon Mela
 Niyoti Aamar
 Hazar Tarar Prodeep
 Dag

Mixed albums
 Neel Bedona with Sabina Yasmin
 Balaka with Sabina Yasmin
 Noyonmoni with Sabina Yasmin
 Jonmo Theke Jwolchhi with Samina Chowdhury
 Golden Hits of Syed Abdul Hadi & Sabina Yasmin with Sabina Yasmin

Notable songs

Filmography

In popular culture 
A memoir of Hadi, Jiboner Gan, is written by himself. The memoir book, published by Prothoma Prakashani, a sister concern of Prothom Alo, was released on 15 February 2022.

References

External links
 

Living people
1940 births
Dhaka College alumni
University of Dhaka alumni
20th-century Bangladeshi male singers
20th-century Bangladeshi singers
Best Male Playback Singer National Film Award (Bangladesh) winners
Recipients of the Ekushey Padak
People from Kasba Upazila